Munditia delicatula is a minute sea snail, a marine gastropod mollusc in the family Liotiidae, found only in New Zealand.

Description
The height of the shell attains 0.5 mm, its diameter 1.5 mm.

Distribution
This marine species is endemic to Three Kings Islands, New Zealand.

References

 Powell A. W. B., New Zealand Mollusca, William Collins Publishers Ltd, Auckland, New Zealand 1979

External links
  Munditia delicatula; Transactions and Proceedings of the Royal Society of New Zealand 1868-1961; Volume 70, p. 219; 1940-41

delicatula
Gastropods of New Zealand
Gastropods described in 1940